The Honda NS400R was a street-legal road-oriented two-stroke sport bike produced by Honda Motor Co., Ltd between 1985 and 1987.

The NS400R was inspired by Honda's NS500 (also known as the RS500R) 500cc GP-bike ridden by Freddie Spencer.

The NS400R is the largest-displacement, street-legal two-stroke road bike that Honda produced. The limited-production NS400R was only sold from 1985 to 1988 and traces its lineage back to 1979. Honda was cleaning up in 500cc class motocross racing with two-stroke engines, but its four-stroke-powered World Grand Prix road bikes were lagging behind the competition. After internal deliberation over its four-stroke racing heritage, Honda pushed forward into two-stroke development. The water-cooled NS500 fused the power of three two-stroke motocross engines into a compact and lightweight V-3 configuration that produced 120 HP at 11,000 RPM. Freddie Spencer grabbed Honda's first 500cc class win in 15 years on an NS500 in 1982, and then rode a lighter and more powerful NS500 to a 1983 500cc World Championship. The following year, Honda manufactured a limited-production version of the championship racer for privateers called the RS500 that was a near duplicate of the works machine without the specialized exhaust. Yamaha and Suzuki had already released street-legal replica racers, and Honda answered the challenge with the NS400R in 1985. The 387cc liquid-cooled two-stroke V-3 cranked out 72 HP at 9,500 RPM with triple flat-slide carburetors, and a 6-speed transmission wet clutch combination got the power to the ground. TRAC anti-dive front forks and a Pro-Link rear suspension joined a box section alloy frame and triple disc brakes with dual-piston calipers. The road-going replica racer was a street-legal facsimile of the NS500 V-3 that Fast Freddie rode past his 4-cylinder competition to become the youngest ever world champion at 21 years old. Honda discontinued the NS400R in 1988.

NS400R
Two-stroke motorcycles
V3 engines